Italy has competed at the World Athletics Relays since first edition held in 2014, Italian teams have won a bronze medal in 2019.

Medals

Nassau 2014
Italy competed at the first edition of the World Athletics Relays (at what time still known as IAAF World Relays) in Nassau, Bahamas, from 24 to 25 May 2014.

Selected athletes

In this first edition national relay team was made up of only the women's 4x400m team, only five athletes.

Results

Nassau 2015
Italy competed at the 2015 IAAF World Relays in Nassau, Bahamas, from 2 to 3 May 2015.

Selected athletes

17 athletes, 6 men and 11 women, was selected for the event, for the composition of four teams: the 4x100 m men and women, the 4x400 m women. The 4x200 m men did not start.

Results

Men

Women

Nassau 2017
Italy competed at the 2017 IAAF World Relays in Nassau, Bahamas, from 22 to 23 April 2017.

Selected athletes

11 athletes, 6 men and 5 women, was selected for the event for the composition of two teams: the 4x100 m men and the 4x100 m women.

Results

Men

Women

Yokohama 2019
Italy competed at the 2019 IAAF World Relays in Yokohama, Japan, from 11 to 19 May 2019, participating in five of the ten scheduled competitions.

Selected athletes

29 athletes, 14 men and 15 women, was selected for the event.

Composition team and results
On 10 May 2019 Italian Athletics Federation announced the composition of the five national teams to the five competitions in which it will participate.

Silesia 2021
Italy competed at the 2021 World Athletics Relays in Silesia, Poland, from 1 to 2 May 2021, participating in five of the ten scheduled competitions.

Selected athletes

30 athletes, 16 men and 14 women, was selected for the event,  but there were two forfais.

Results
In the heats all five teams qualified for the final, the three who did not yet have the Olympic pass (Men's 4x100 m, Woman 4x400 m and Mixed 4x400 m), got it.

Men

Women

Mixed

See also
Italian national track relay team

Notes

References

External links
World Athletics Relays at World Athletics

 
Athletics in Italy
Nations at the World Athletics Relays
Italy national athletics team